Rémy Cogghe, originally spelled Rémi Coghe ( 31 October 1854 – 2 April 1935) was a Belgian-born painter, residing in France.

Biography
He was born in Mouscron. When he was thirteen, his father moved the family to France to take a job as a spinner in the industrial town of Roubaix. He took his first art lessons at the local Academy. In 1876, he entered the École des Beaux-arts, where he studied under Alexandre Cabanel. Four years later, he was a candidate for the Prix de Rome, but it was discovered that he was still a Belgian citizen, so he returned to Mouscron, took temporary lodgings and applied for the Prix de Rome (Belgium) from the Royal Academy of Fine Arts (Antwerp). He was awarded the prize in 1879 and received a gold medal for his painting The Aduatuci Sold as Slaves.

Cogghe spent the next five years travelling extensively throughout Spain and Italy, with visits to Algeria and Tunisia, painting prolifically all the way. In 1885, he returned to Roubaix and moved in with his parents. By 1893, he had become successful enough that he could afford to build his own house. He specialized in portraits, but also painted scenes from the daily life of Roubaix and the surrounding region. Between 1879 and 1926, he exhibited in the foreign section at the Salon twenty-nine times.

Cogghe died on 2 April 1935 in Roubaix.

References

Further reading
 Amandine Delcourt, series editor, Les Rémy Cogghe de La Piscine, Invenit & La Picine (2009) 
 Dominique Piteux-Vallin, Rémy Cogghe 1854-1935, Presses universitaires du Septentrion (2007) 
 Ville de Roubaix; introduction by Jean-Pierre Detremmerie and André Diligent : Rémy Cogghe (1854-1935) : catalogue de l'exposition, Roubaix, France, du 16 novembre au 24 décembre 1985, Mouscron, Belgique, du 10 janvier au 26 janvier 1986, édité par la ville de Roubaix, 1985.

External links

 Arcadja Auctions: More works by Cogghe
 Roubaix website: Maison du peintre Rémy Cogghe, Monument historique
 Roubaix-la Piscine: Cockfight in Flanders

1854 births
1935 deaths
People from Mouscron
Belgian genre painters
Belgian emigrants to France
19th-century Belgian painters
19th-century Belgian male artists
20th-century Belgian painters
20th-century Belgian male artists